Haliotis rugosa pustulata is a subspecies of sea snail, a marine gastropod mollusk in the family Haliotidae, the abalones.

Description
The size of the shell varies between 25 mm and 60 mm.

Distribution
This marine subspecies occurs in the Red Sea and in the western part of the Indian Ocean.

References

 Kilburn R.N. (1972). Taxonomic notes on South African marine Mollusca, with the description of new species and subspecies of Conus, Nassarius, Vexillum and Demoulia. Annals of the Natal Museum 21(2):391–437
 Geiger D.L. & Poppe G.T. (2000). A Conchological Iconography: The family Haliotidae. Conchbooks, Hackenheim Germany. 135pp 83pls
 Geiger D.L. & Owen B. (2012) Abalone: Worldwide Haliotidae. Hackenheim: Conchbooks. viii + 361 pp. [29 February 2012] page(s): 113

External links
 
 Owen B. (2013) Notes on the correct taxonomic status of Haliotis rugosa Lamarck, 1822, and Haliotis pustulata Reeve, 1846, with description of a new subspecies from Rodrigues Island, Mascarene Islands, Indian Ocean (Mollusca: Vetigastropoda: Haliotidae). Zootaxa 3646(2): 189–193.

rugosa pustulata